Road signs in Brunei closely follow the traffic sign regulations used in Singapore as well as the United Kingdom to a lesser extent. A number of changes have also been introduced over the years to suit local road conditions. There are also some differences in the typefaces used, although DIN 1451 remains widely used.

Brunei traffic signs are mostly in Malay, the official and national language of the country. Both Jawi and Latin script are used. However, English is also used in important public places such as tourist attractions, airports and immigration checkpoints.

Regulatory signs 
Regulatory signs either give positive instructions ("mandatory signs") or indicate a prohibition ("prohibitionary signs"). Many regulatory signs are accompanied by supplementary plates that indicate exceptions to the rule or additional instruction or information to facilitate understanding of the rule.

Priority signs 
These are the octagonal red STOP sign, the triangular GIVE WAY sign and the various mandatory STOP signs

Prohibitory signs 
Prohibitory signs, which generally tell drivers what they must not do, are mostly circular and have a red border. A red ring indicatesa total prohibition; diagonal bars indicate the prohibition of a specific manoeuvre (e.g. banned left or right turns) or that the prohibition applies to a certain class of vehicle (e.g. lorries).

Mandatory signs 
Mandatory signs are generally circular with a white border and a white symbol on a blue background. They usually indicate something that drivers must do (e.g. keep left) or a facility only available to certain classes of traffic (e.g. bicycles).

Warning signs 
Warning signs warn of possible dangers or unusual conditions or alert motorists to possible hazards. They are usually triangles with a red border.

Information signs 
Information signs indicate a certain condition or nature of the road ahead of which motorists should take note. They are separate from existing mandatory and prohibitory signs. They are usually white or blue, and rectangular in shape.

See also 
 Brunei National Roads System
 Road signs in Singapore
 Road signs in Malaysia

Signs
Brunei